Tabas-e Masina Rural District is in Gazik District of Darmian County, South Khorasan province, Iran. At the National Census of 2006, its population was 8,347 in 1,733 households. There were 4,554 inhabitants in 1,072 households at the following census of 2011. At the most recent census of 2016, the population of the rural district was 4,778 in 1,147 households. The largest of its 28 villages was Dastgerd, with 1,262 people.

References 

Darmian County

Rural Districts of South Khorasan Province

Populated places in South Khorasan Province

Populated places in Darmian County